El Rancho Hotel may refer to

El Rancho Hotel and Casino, a former and demolished hotel and casino in Las Vegas
El Rancho Hotel & Motel a National Historic Site in Gallup, New Mexico
 El Rancho Hotel Haiti